Kalinniki is a rural locality (a selo) and the administrative centre of Kalinnikovsky Selsoviet, Birsky District, Bashkortostan, Russia. The population was 1,005 as of 2010. There are 17 streets.

Geography 
Kalinniki is located 30 km southeast of Birsk (the district's administrative centre) by road. Zuyevo is the nearest rural locality.

References 

Rural localities in Birsky District